Public transport in Ireland exists in many of the Ireland's urban areas and rural areas, and takes a number of forms. Bus transport is the main form of public transport and is common in all cities. The cities, Dublin, Belfast, Cork, Derry, Limerick and Galway all have their own suburban rail networks, although Dublin is the only to have its own tram line, in the form of the Luas. Ireland has a population of 5 million people. 

Recently, in 2021, the Irish government released the climate action plan. This sees two brand new Dart (Tram/Train) lines west and south of Dublin, Ireland's first underground metro (Metrolink), a brand new electric train fleet delivered by Alstrom, extension to Luas (Tram) to North Dublin Finglas and more funding for Ireland's rural transport, Local Link.

Transport for Ireland is a public information body set up by the National Transport Authority as a single point of reference for all public transport in Ireland. TFI (Transport for Ireland) has a travel card available to its service users and tourists. It offers much cheaper transport fares compared to cash. Cards and information can be found at www.leapcard.ie

Provision by area

Dublin

The Greater Dublin area has a population of 2.1 million (CSO 2020) and there are a number of modes of public transport in the GDA run by a number of transport operators, most of them state or quasi-state entities.  Public transport in Dublin is overseen by the National Transport Authority.  It has undergone expansion in recent years, and the Irish Government plans to invest heavily in the system under the Transport 21 plan which means that approximately 20 billion euro will be spent on developing Greater Dublin's transport infrastructure. Dublin's transit system utilises electrified suburban trains, diesel commuter rail, trams and an extensive bus network to provide service to the population of the Greater Dublin Area.

Buses are the most widely used form of public transport in Dublin. They are predominately operated by Dublin Bus and also a private operator Go-Ahead Ireland, part of the UK based Go-Ahead Group. The bus network consists of 200 bus routes covering the Greater Dublin Area. The Bus Arrival Information Service is being rolled out across Dublin, and provides real-time estimates of bus arrivals at each stop, based on GPS locations of buses.

Dublin also has a commuter rail system, one of five suburban rail networks on the island. The system uses diesel-powered trains and an electrified line. There are four main lines, designated Northern Commuter, Western Commuter, South Eastern Commuter, and South Western Commuter. The trains are operated by Iarnród Éireann.

The Dublin suburban network also consists of an electrified line Dublin Area Rapid Transit that serves the Dublin bay commuter belt.

 Northern Commuter – Dublin Pearse to Dundalk.
 South Eastern Commuter – Dublin Connolly to Wexford/Rosslare Europort.
 South Western Commuter – Dublin Heuston to Kildare.
 Western Commuter – Dublin Pearse / Docklands to Longford.
 Dublin Area Rapid Transit (DART) – Greystones to Howth/Malahide.

There is also a tram network called LUAS consisting of two lines;
 Red Line: Tallaght to The Point and Saggart to Connolly
 Green Line: Broombridge to Bride’s Glen

As of 2006, the Dublin Metro is a planned two-line rapid transit (underground) system set out in the Irish government's 2005 Transport 21 plan to spend 20 billion euro on infrastructure in the Greater Dublin area up until 2021. The estimated cost of the 17 km Metro North is approximately 5 billion euro and will be the biggest and most expensive infrastructural project ever undertaken on the island of Ireland.

Cork

The Greater Cork area has a population of 400,000 and is covered mainly by bus and suburban rail networks as well as a commuter ferry.

There are a total of 35 bus routes of which, 18 are Citybus routes serving areas like Cork City, Knocknaheeny, Ballinlough, Cork, Mahon, Cork, Mayfield, Cork, Frankfield, Cork, Ballintemple and Farranree, Cork and 17 suburban routes serving towns such as Glanmire, Ballincollig, Carrigaline, Douglas, Midleton, Mallow, Cobh and Goleen.

By 2010, there will be 3 suburban train lines in the Cork Suburban Rail service.

Cork Kent – Blarney ED (15,000) – Mallow (11,000)
Cork Kent – Glanmire (16,000) – Cobh (12,000)
Cork Kent – Glanmire (16,000) – Midleton (11,000)

There is also a car ferry operating between Rushbrooke and Passage West.

Limerick

The Limerick greater/metro area has a population of 162,000 and is covered mainly by bus and suburban rail networks.

There are a total of 9 Citybus routes, serving areas such as Raheen, Dooradoyle, Ballycummin, University of Limerick, O'Malley Park, Monaleen, Caherdavin and Castletroy.

Commuter rail services are also important and there are three train lines in the Limerick Suburban Rail network.

Limerick railway station – Ennis (25,000)
Limerick railway station – Nenagh (9,000)
Limerick railway station – Tipperary (5,000)

Derry

The Derry City area has a population of 110,000, with a greater hinterland of 350,000 is served by both rail and bus services provided by the public transport company Translink. There are 15 bus routes serving parts of the city. Which had the monopoly on the route due to licensing rights with the DVLNI. This service is now run by Ulsterbus Foyle.
For the various surrounding towns and villages around the city, there are Ulsterbus services travelling into the city centre.

The city is serviced by Waterside Station on the Belfast-Derry line which serves Belfast Central and Belfast Great Victoria Street, running via Coleraine (for the Coleraine-Portrush railway line to Portrush) and Antrim.  The railway line was upgraded with a track relay and planned passing loops to be installed

Galway

The city of Galway has a population of 70,000 and there are two companies providing bus services throughout the city – Bus Éireann and Galway City Direct. There are 16 bus routes serving the city and its suburbs altogether – Bus Éireann operates 11 routes, while Galway City Direct runs 5 routes.

From 2008 on, Galway Suburban Rail will have one rail line connecting Galway and the satellite towns of Oranmore (5,000) and Athenry (3,000).

Overview table
The table below lists cities in Ireland that have public transport systems. It includes only internal services (as opposed to services between towns).

See also
 Transport in Ireland
Luas
Rail transport in Ireland

External links
 Transport for Ireland

References